Česká Čermná is a municipality and village in Náchod District in the Hradec Králové Region of the Czech Republic. It has about 500 inhabitants.

Notable people
Petr Pavel (born 1961), army general and president-elect of the Czech Republic; has a weekend residence here

References

Villages in Náchod District